Oak Cemetery is a historic cemetery at Greenwood and Dodson Avenues in Fort Smith, Arkansas. Established in 1853, it is the city's oldest and largest cemetery, and the burial site of many of its most prominent citizens. Noted burials include Fort Smith founder John Rogers.

The cemetery was listed on the National Register of Historic Places in 1995.

See also
 National Register of Historic Places listings in Sebastian County, Arkansas

References

External links
 

Cemeteries on the National Register of Historic Places in Arkansas
Buildings and structures completed in 1853
Buildings and structures in Fort Smith, Arkansas
Protected areas of Sebastian County, Arkansas
National Register of Historic Places in Sebastian County, Arkansas
Cemeteries established in the 1850s